Parliamentary elections were held in Afghanistan between 6 and 15 April 1988 to elect members of the bicameral National Assembly, which replaced the Revolutionary Council. Although the elections were marked by violence and boycotted by the mujahideen, the government left 50 of the 234 seats vacant in the House of the People and a small number of seats in the House of Elders, with hope that the guerrillas would abandon their armed struggle and present their own representatives to participate in the new administration. The National Front won every one of the seats contested, with the People's Democratic Party serving as the predominant party of the coalition.

Results

Elections in Afghanistan
Afghanistan
Parliamentary election
National Assembly (Afghanistan)
Afghanistan
Election and referendum articles with incomplete results